Elmar Stegmann is a male former international table tennis player from Germany.

He won a bronze medal at the 1963 World Table Tennis Championships in the Swaythling Cup (men's team event) with Eric Arndt, Dieter Michalek, Eberhard Schöler and Ernst Gomolla.

See also
 List of table tennis players
 List of World Table Tennis Championships medalists

References

German male table tennis players
1935 births
Living people
World Table Tennis Championships medalists
People from Neu-Ulm (district)
Sportspeople from Swabia (Bavaria)